Lithophane patefacta, the dimorphic pinion, is a species of cutworm or dart moth in the family Noctuidae. It is found in North America.

The MONA or Hodges number for Lithophane patefacta is 9886.

References

Further reading

 
 
 

patefacta
Articles created by Qbugbot
Moths described in 1858